Gogua is a Georgian surname. Notable people with the surname include:
Alexey Gogua (born 1932), Abkhaz writer
Gogita Gogua (born 1983), Georgian footballer

Surnames of Georgian origin
Georgian-language surnames
Surnames of Abkhazian origin